Why the Whales Came is a children's story written by Michael Morpurgo and first published in 1985 by William Heinemann (UK) and Scholastic (US). It is set on the island of Bryher, one of the Isles of Scilly, off the coast of Cornwall, in the year 1914

Plot summary
'Why the Whales Came' is about ten-year-old Gracie Jenkins, who lives on Bryher, a small island off the western coast of Britain, in the year 1914. "You keep away from the Birdman," Gracie's Father had warned her. The Birdman lives alone in a cottage that stands all by itself on a hill in the south part of the island. Gracie's father knows stories about him that he thinks are too horrible to tell her. The Birdman used to live on Samson Island, which people say has a curse on it.

Gracie and her friend Daniel have a fleet of toy boats they have made. When the lake where they usually sail the boats is taken over by bad-tempered swans, Daniel talks Gracie into coming with him to a cove near the Birdman's cottage. She's scared, but she finally agrees. Soon they find themselves on the most frightening adventure of their lives. Gracie's dad also goes to war and is reported missing in action.

The whales in the novel are narwhals, a type of whale with a long, spiralling horn on the front of its head. In their adventure, Gracie and Daniel find a narwhal's horn. Later, they have to decide whether to help a stranded narwhal. They then rescue the narwhal. Later, the Birdman comes back to Bryher, and he is welcomed back by everybody.

Characters
Gracie Jenkins —At the beginning, Gracie was a habitually fearful girl that believed any story told to her about the Birdman. She also believed in ghosts and the curses on Samson Island. Her best friend is Daniel Pender.
Daniel Pender—Daniel is a handy boy, but he is also adventurous and social. But Daniel is also afraid of the dark.
Zachariah Woodcock—A deaf old man that lives in a cottage away from all the island people also known as the Birdman. He is also a wonderful woodworker that makes bird sculptures. Woodcock likes travelling by sea to Samson with his dog Prince.
Peter Jenkins—The father of Gracie, he has a slightly angry personality in the story, but is also a good liar/actor at the same time.
Clemmie Jenkins—The mother of Gracie who possesses a calm but "weird" personality. Not so much an actor in the story, but she is really fearful.
Treve Pender—The father of Daniel. Slaps Daniel a lot. Not mentioned a lot in the story.
Mary Pender—The mother of Daniel. Not mentioned a lot in the story.
Mr. Wellbeloved—Gracie and Daniel's teacher who judges every student by arithmetic. He also predicted that the war will come. That came true later in the story.
Big Tim Pender—Tim is a bully to Gracie and Daniel, but he is also Daniel's brother.
The Preventative—they are a group of people that want to take driftwood from the island.

Publishing Date
'Why The Whales Came' was originally published in 1985 by Willam Heinemann LTD

References

1985 British novels
Children's historical novels
British children's novels
Novels by Michael Morpurgo
Novels set in Cornwall
Fiction about whales
Fiction set in 1914
Bryher
Children's novels about animals
1985 children's books
Heinemann (publisher) books